Puffball Collective is a fictional group appearing in American comic books published by Marvel Comics and DC Comics.

Origin
Shortly after the Hulk was banished to the Crossroads (a dimension of infinite time and space containing an infinite number of gateways to any and all worlds and dimensions, where the Hulk could hopefully find a world where he would finally know peace) by Doctor Strange for becoming too great a danger to himself and others, the Hulk met an entity called the Puffball Collective. The Puffball Collective was composed of a multitude of pale yellow thistle-like puffballs. The Puffball Collective tried to help the Hulk, who had lost all of Bruce Banner's intellect and persona and now had the mentality of a feral animal. The Puffball Collective inspired the Hulk to try to think and survive and to try to find food to eat before the Hulk starved to death. The Puffball Collective would sometime psychically probe the Hulk's mind just to get a response out of him.

Though the Puffball Collective could not leave the Crossroads, it and the Hulk defeated the U-Foes, who had accidentally trapped themselves there. Later the Hulk and the Puffball Collective became part of the crew of the space vessel Andromeda, helmed by Xeron the Starslayer and Captain Cybor. With the help of a powerful force field the Puffball Collective was finally able to leave the Crossroads and help the crew of the Andromeda pursue Klaatu the Energy Eater.

After the Hulk and the Puffball Collective returned to the Crossroads, the Puffball Collective asked the Hulk to help it return to its home world, a world it described as a paradise until it was destroyed by a dark evil that had spread across the land. Though it could now leave the Crossroads, the gateway to its world was barricaded by chains which the Puffball Collective lacked the strength to break but the Hulk could.

Finding the Puffball Collective's world was now a desolate wasteland, the Hulk finally learned the truth. The Puffball Collective was once part of a greater worldwide Collective. The small faction of the greater Collective which was the Puffball Collective secretly studied arcane magic. Using this magic it summoned a horde of demons. The N'Garai quickly started killing the Collective and destroying the planet. When the worldwide Collective discovered that the Puffball Collective was responsible for summoning the N'Garai, the worldwide Collective exiled the Puffball Collective to the Crossroads. Betrayed to the N'Garai by the Puffball Collective, the Hulk escaped with the help of three parts of his subconscious who manifested themselves as the entities Glow, Guardian and Goblin. Once back at the Crossroads, the Hulk quickly repaired the chains that had once blocked the gateway to the Puffball Collective's world, leaving the Puffball Collective to be destroyed by the very demons he summoned ages ago.

In 1987, writer John Byrne brought the Puffball Collective to the DC universe, where, after absorbing a dying member of the Green Lantern Corps, it became a Green Lantern itself.

Physical attributes
The Puffball Collective generally appeared as a nondescript pile of pale yellow fluff. Though it could imitate the shape of anything it encountered, it appeared to be limited to roughly its own size which was between 6 and 8 feet tall. It also could not duplicate that object's ability ( I.E. It could not lift any kind great weights like the Hulk.) The Puffball Collective could not be harmed by physical force. It could only be scattered and could simply just reform its shape. It was however vulnerable to heat and fire.

The Puffball Collective was also a telepath. It could probe the mind of the Hulk and read it like a book (note that at the time the Hulk had the mind of the Savage Hulk and only a few of Banner's memories). It could also project its thoughts. Though it is never stated, one could surmise that these abilities may come from living as part of a collective of billions of such creatures.

References

External links
 Puffball Collective at Marvel Wiki
 Puffball Collective at Marvel Appendix

Marvel Comics characters